Deone Zanotto is an Australian actress, singer and dancer. She has appeared on stage in musicals such as West Side Story, Mack and Mabel, Footloose, Like Me.

Along with Ben Mingay she was nominated for the 2005 ARIA Award for Best Original Soundtrack, Cast or Show Album for Dirty Dancing - The Classic Story on Stage.

Awards and nominations

ARIA Music Awards
The ARIA Music Awards is an annual awards ceremony that recognises excellence, innovation, and achievement across all genres of Australian music. They commenced in 1987. 

! 
|-
| 2005
| Dirty Dancing - The Classic Story on Stage (with Ben Mingay)
| Best Original Cast or Show Album
| 
| 
|-

References

Australian musical theatre actresses
Living people
Year of birth missing (living people)